Singapore competed at the 1984 Summer Olympics in Los Angeles, United States.  The nation returned to the Olympic Games after participating in the American-led boycott of the 1980 Summer Olympics.

Results and competitors by event

Swimming at the 1984 Summer Olympics
Men's 100m Freestyle 
Ang Peng Siong
 Heat — 51.66
 B-Final — 51.09 (→ 9th place)

Oon Jin-Gee
 Heat — 54.17 (→ did not advance, 42nd place)

Men's 100m Backstroke 
David Lim Fong Jock
 Heat — 1:00.65 (→ did not advance, 29th place)

Men's 100m Breaststroke
Oon Jin Teik
 Heat — 1:09.23 (→ did not advance, 42nd place)

Men's 100m Butterfly
Ang Peng Siong
 Heat — 56.61 (→ did not advance, 27th place)

Men's 4 × 100 m Freestyle Relay 
Ang Peng Siong, Oon Jin Teik, David Lim Fong Jock, Oon Jin-Gee
 Heat — 3:34.63 (→ did not advance, 17th place)

Men's 4 × 100 m Medley Relay
David Lim Fong Jock, Oon Jin Teik, Ang Peng Siong, and Oon Jin-Gee
 Heat — 4:00.07 (→ did not advance, 16th place)

References
Official Olympic Reports
sports-reference

Nations at the 1984 Summer Olympics
1984
1984 in Singaporean sport